Tongulakh is a rural locality (a selo) in Maltaninsky Rural Okrug of Gorny District in the Sakha Republic, Russia, located  from Berdigestyakh, the administrative center of the district, and  from Keptin, the administrative center of the rural okrug. Its population as of the 2010 Census was 10; down from 11 recorded in the 2002 Census.

Climate
The region is known for its climate extremes and is one of the coldest areas in the Northern Hemisphere.

References

Notes

Sources
Official website of the Sakha Republic. Registry of the Administrative-Territorial Divisions of the Sakha Republic. Gorny District. }

Rural localities in Gorny District